Aflao is a town in Ketu South District in the Volta Region on Ghana's border with Togo.  Aflao is the twenty-eighth most populous settlement in Ghana, in terms of population, with a population of 96,550 people.

In the 18th century, Aflao served as one of the major markets for the slave trade. Aflao is shared by Ghana and Togo, causing the land to be split into Aflao of Ghana and Aflao of Togo. The culture of this land is based on their clothes, called Kente or kete. Their local music is Agbadja and Brekete. Ghanaian authorities plan to create a common post at Aflao.

History

Aflao people were war refugees of Phla extraction from Grand Popo in Benin. The exodus from Grand Popo was the result of the Wars by the Kingdom of Dahomey for access to the Atlantic seaboard and European trading forts along the coast of Benin  and Togo. Other war refugees who were of GaDangme extraction and displaced by the Akwamu wars also settled in Aflao. The GaDangme settled in the suburbs of Teshie, Gbugbla and Batorme. Constant skirmishes with the Bes of Togo for land and fishing rights compelled some of the Ga Dangme to relocate to Agortime area to join their kinsmen there.

Etymology
Ewe Fla:wo    Phla/ Phera people

Phla/Phera belongs to the Gbe (Tadoid) language cluster

Geography 

Aflao is located on the eastern coast of Ghana and is the major border town with neighboring Togo.

Chieftaincy 
Aflao - Ghana as a traditional area has Togbui Amenya Fiti V as its Paramount Chief. He is the traditional ruler of the land and performs traditional administrative and ceremonial functions in the area. Aflao - Togo has a different chief because of the different villages on this land. Aflao has an education school on the border of Lomé that teaches Ewe, the local language of Aflao.

Industry 
The Diamond Cement Ghana Limited factory is located at Aflao.

In early 2014, a 2.5 km rail siding was completed to connect the cement works to the port of Lomé. This siding crosses the border from Togo to Ghana and is of the  gauge.

Transportation
There is public transportation from Aflao to major cities such as Accra, Kumasi, Techiman, Mim, Ahafo, Sunyani, Takoradi, Tema, Ho, Wa, Bolgatanga, and Elubo.

Notable people 
 Dzifa Gomashie, MP
Joseph Kossivi Ahiator, artist
 Komla Dumor, journalist
 Thomas Amegnaglo, footballer

See also 
 Railway stations in Togo
 Railway stations in Ghana

References 

 Dickson, K. B.  "Trade Patterns in Ghana at the Beginning of the Eighteenth Century."  Geographical Review 56.3 (1966): 417–431.

External links 

 Ghana-pedia webpage - Aflao

Populated places in the Volta Region
Ghana–Togo border crossings